Aaron Shawn Harper (born July 9, 1968) is a former American football offensive tackle in the National Football League, who played for the Indianapolis Colts and appeared on MTV's Made.

Football career 
Harper was drafted by the Los Angeles Rams in 1992. Throughout his career, he played for the Rams, the Houston Oilers, the Indianapolis Colts and three years in NFL Europe with the Amsterdam Admirals and Frankfurt Galaxy.

Personal life 
Since 2007 Harper has been a member of the Central Ohio Salvation Army Advisory Board and donated his time to many endeavors of that organization.  In 2011 Harper co-chaired the Christmas Kettle volunteer program.  Additionally, he has spoken and challenged Salvation Army groups across the country. His company American Service Protection has installed several security systems for Salvation Army facilities as well as provide guard protection for various activities.

Harper has a wife and one son. 

In an interview with CBN, Harper gave the following advice: "To  that in some instances that you are not disabled, but you are uniquely enabled. You have been called for a particular plan and a particular purpose. You have a calling for a particular season and a particular reason. Embrace who you are; you’re a unique individual. The quest for you is to hook up with your God-given assignment, and live it to its fullest. There you’ll find success and happiness."

References

External links
shawnharper.org

1968 births
Living people
Players of American football from Columbus, Ohio
American football offensive tackles
Indiana Hoosiers football players
Los Angeles Rams players
Indianapolis Colts players
Houston Oilers players
Amsterdam Admirals players
Frankfurt Galaxy players